George Knight may refer to:

Sportsmen 
 George T. Knight (cricketer) (1795–1867), English amateur cricketer
 George Knight (cricketer, born 1835) (1835–1901), English cricketer
 George Knight (baseball) (1855–1912), baseball player
 George Knight (Australian footballer) (1887–1947), Australian footballer for Melbourne
 George Knight (footballer, born 1921) (1921–2011), English professional footballer
 George Knight (American football) (born 1898), American football player

Theologians 
 George T. Knight (Universalist) (1850–1911), American theologian
 George R. Knight (born 1941), Seventh-day Adventist Church historian
 George W. Knight III (born 1931), theologian and professor of New Testament at Greenville Presbyterian Theological Seminary
 G. A. Frank Knight (1869–1937), Scottish theologian

Others 
 George Wilfrid Holford Knight (1877–1936), British politician, MP for Nottingham South
 George Robert Knight (1879–1961), Australian rose breeder
 G. Wilson Knight (1897–1985), English literary critic